The Brazilian Athletics Confederation (CBAt; Confederação Brasileira de Atletismo) is the governing body for the sport of athletics in Brazil.  President for the period 2013-2016 is José Antonio Martins Fernandes.

History 
CBAt was founded on December 2, 1977.  It replaced the Federação Brasileira de Sportes Atleticos, which was founded in 1914.

Former president until 2013 was Roberto Gesta de Melo.

Affiliations 
CBAt is the national member federation for Brazil in the following international organisations:
World Athletics
Confederación Sudamericana de Atletismo (CONSUDATLE; South American Athletics Confederation)
Association of Panamerican Athletics (APA)
Asociación Iberoamericana de Atletismo (AIA; Ibero-American Athletics Association)
Moreover, it is part of the following national organisations:
Brazilian Olympic Committee

Member federations 

CBAt comprises the athletics federations of the Brazilian federal states.

Kit suppliers 
Brazil's kits are currently supplied by Nike.

National records 
CBAt maintains the Brazilian records in athletics

References

External links 
 

Athletics
Brazil
 
National governing bodies for athletics
Sports organizations established in 1977